"Wires" is a song by British rock band Athlete, from their second studio album, Tourist. It was released on 17 January 2005 as the lead single from that album, peaking at number four on the UK Singles Chart. The song was written by lead singer Joel Pott about his daughter, who became ill after birth and was rushed to intensive care. Pott paid tribute to hospital worker Ben McQuade, who played a major part in saving his daughter's life.

In 2012, Rylan Clark-Neal performed "Wires" on the ninth series of British television music competition The X Factor. The week after Clark-Neal's performance, the original version by Athlete re-entered the UK Singles Chart at number 40.

Music video
The music video for "Wires" was directed by David Chaudoir and filmed on a former secret military test site at Orford Ness on the Suffolk coast.

Track listings
UK CD1 and Australian CD single 
 "Wires"
 "Never Running Out"

UK CD2 
 "Wires" (radio edit)
 "Never Running Out"
 "Get It Back"
 "Wires" (video)

UK 7-inch single 
A. "Wires" (radio edit) – 4:07
B. "Transformer Man" – 3:18

Charts

Weekly charts

Year-end charts

Certifications

Release history

References

External links
 Athlete.mu – official website

2005 singles
2005 songs
Athlete (band) songs
Parlophone singles
Songs about parenthood
Songs written by Carey Willetts
Songs written by Joel Pott